"" (Highly gloryfied in Heaven) is a Christian hymn in German for the Feast of the Ascension. The German text appeared in Mainz, and the melody in Konstanz in 1613. It became part of regional sections of the German Catholic hymnal Gotteslob.

History 
"" is hymn in German for the Feast of the Ascension. The text appeared in Mainz in 1973, while the melody appeared in Konstanz in 1613. Each line is closed by Halleluja.

The song became part of regional sections of the first German Catholic hymnal Gotteslob in 1975, such as 833 in the Diocese of Limburg where it was retained in the second edition as GL 785.

References 

20th-century hymns in German
1973 songs
Eastertide
Ascension of Jesus